Donna Andrews (born April 12, 1967) is an American professional golfer.

Born in Lynchburg, Virginia, Andrews played college golf at the University of North Carolina in Chapel Hill, and won the North and South Women's Amateur at Pinehurst in 1988.

Andrews' rookie season on the LPGA Tour was 1990; she won six titles between 1993 and 1998, including a major championship, the 1994 Nabisco Dinah Shore, won with a birdie on the final hole. Her best finish on the money list was third in 1998, and she also made the top ten in 1993 (9th) and 1994 (5th). Andrews  represented the United States in the Solheim Cup in 1994 and 1998, and was the captain of the Junior Solheim Cup team in 2007.

After her retirement from LPGA Tour, Andrews became a golf instructor at Pine Needles Resort near Pinehurst, North Carolina and is co-owner of Andrews and James Real Estate. Andrews has two children; son Connor and daughter Sarah with husband James Tepatti.

In 2005, Andrews was inducted into the Virginia Sports Hall of Fame. In 2017, she became the first woman inducted into the Virginia Golf Hall of Fame. Andrews was inducted to the North Carolina Sports Hall of Fame in 2018.

Professional wins

LPGA Tour wins (6)

LPGA Tour playoff record (0–3)

Other wins (1)
1996 JCPenney Classic (with Mike Hulbert)

Major championships

Wins (1)

Team appearances
Professional
Solheim Cup (representing the United States): 1994 (winners), 1998 (winners)

References

External links

American female golfers
LPGA Tour golfers
Winners of LPGA major golf championships
Solheim Cup competitors for the United States
Golfers from Virginia
North Carolina Tar Heels women's golfers
Sportspeople from Lynchburg, Virginia
1967 births
Living people